The following lists events that happened during the 1760s in South Africa.

Events

1760
 trekboers Jansz Coetse, Klas Barends and others cross the Gariep River (now called the Orange River)

1763
 11 September – The "La Fortune", a French man-of-war, is wrecked near Mossel Bay in the Cape Colony while on its way from Réunion

1766
 112 slaves from Madagascar arrive in Cape Town after a slave uprising on board the slaver ship Meermin.

Births
 1 February 1761 – Christian Hendrik Persoon, mycologist, is born in the Cape Colony

Deaths
 1760 – Hendrik Swellengrebel, Governor of the Cape Colony, dies

References
See Years in South Africa for list of References

History of South Africa